Ateleia is a genus of legume in the family Fabaceae. It contains the following species:
 Ateleia albolutescens Mohlenbr.
 Ateleia apetala Griseb.
 Ateleia arsenii Standl.

 Ateleia glazioveana Baill.
 Ateleia gummifera (Bertero ex DC.) D. Dietr.
 Ateleia guaraya Herzog

 Ateleia herbert-smithii Pittier
 Ateleia insularis Standl.
 Ateleia mcvaughii Rudd
 Ateleia microcarpa (Pers.) D. Dietr.

 Ateleia ovata Mohlenbr.

 Ateleia popenoei Correll
 Ateleia pterocarpa D. Dietr.

 Ateleia salicifolia Mohlenbr.
 Ateleia standleyana Mohlenbr.
 Ateleia tomentosa Rudd
 Ateleia truncata Mohlenbr.

 Ateleia venezuelensis Mohlenbr.

References

Swartzieae
Fabaceae genera
Taxonomy articles created by Polbot